Margit Kovács (1902–1977) was a Hungarian ceramist and sculptor.

Life

Margit Kovács was born into a Jewish Hungarian family  in Győr, Hungary on 30 November 1902. She originally wished to become a graphic artist but she grew interested in ceramics in the 1920s and went to study in Vienna with Hertha Bücher, a famous Austrian ceramic artist, from 1926-1928. Then she studied clay modelling in Munich at the State School of Applied Arts under Karl Killer (1928–29). She was a fellow student here, then lifelong friend of Julia Bathory, glass artist. She studied in Copenhagen in 1932 and in 1933 she was at Sèvres Porcelain factory where she mastered the art of modelling with chamotte clay to make figures.

She won international awards in Milan, Paris, Berlin, Brussels and Rome. She was very popular in Hungary and received many public commissions. The Communist regime gave her the Distinguished Artist Award in 1959.

Work
Her first public exhibition was in Budapest in 1928 and from then on her output was prolific and she continued working throughout the Second World War. She produced statuettes, pots, plates, wall plaques and tiled murals.

Her main themes are country folk, family life and bible stories. Her work is very varied but is characterised by flowing lines which curve sensually to evoke sentiment. One of her most significant works of religious art is the portal of the Saint Emeric Church (Szent Imre templom) of Győr (1939–1940).

Several of her ceramic murals are still visible in Budapest and other cities. Those in Budapest at the time of her death were:

In 1972 she donated the majority of her work to the Pest County Museums Directorate in Szentendre. A museum of her work was opened in 1973 in Vastagh Street, Szentendre. There is also a collection in Győr.

Death 
Kovács died in Budapest on 4 June 1977. Her grave is in Farkasréti Cemetery in Budapest.

Gallery

References

 Lea Schenk, Margit Kovács Photo Album, Budapest, 2007  (2001)
 Ilona Pataky-Brestyánszky, Margit Kovács, Budapest, Corvina/Képzőművészti Kiadó, 1976

External links

 The Kovács museum
 Fine Art in Hungary
 International Art Portal
 Pottery, Politics and Identity: Three Hungarian Ceramicists and the Central European Diaspora 

1902 births
1977 deaths
Hungarian ceramists
Hungarian sculptors
Hungarian women ceramists
Burials at Farkasréti Cemetery
20th-century Hungarian sculptors
20th-century Hungarian women artists
20th-century ceramists
Hungarian women sculptors